Alice Margaret Coats (15 June 1905– 19 May 1978, Bath) was a British watercolor painter, engraver, woodcut artist, and author. She was a member of the Central Club of Wood-Engravers in Colour. She is best known for botanical and horticultural works.

Life 
Alice Margaret Coats was born on 15 June 1905 in Handsworth, Birmingham to a Scottish clergyman, the Rev. Robert Hay Coats, and his wife Margaret, who was from Glasgow. Coats was educated at Edgbaston High School before studying at the Birmingham Central School of Art between 1922 and 1928, at the Slade School of Fine Art in London and in Paris during the 1930s at Andre Lhote's school. Coats produced book illustrations, flower paintings on silk, colour woodcuts, and landscape paintings in both oil and watercolours.

Between 1933 and 1939 Coats was an organizing secretary of the ‘Birmingham Group’ of artists and during World War II from 1940 to 1945 served in the Land Army helping to cultivate land on which Birmingham University housing was later built.

In the 1950s, her artistic career was cut short by arthritis and since then she concentrated on her writings and the study of horticultural history. Coats wrote a series of scholarly articles and books on horticultural history and biography that were recognized by the Royal Horticultural Society and the University of Birmingham.

In 1965, Coats joined the newly founded Garden History Society and contributed articles to Garden History.

Her first book Flowers and their History was published in 1956. Among her other works were Garden Shrubs and their Histories (1963), The Quest for Plants: a History of the Horticultural Explorers (1969), The Treasury of Flowers (1975), and Lord Bute (1975). Her book The Book of Flowers (1973) included woodcuts, engravings and watercolors.

Exhibitions 
 1961 Kenya, Nairobi, Sorsbie Gallery
 1961 India, Mumbai, Jehangir Nicholson Gallery
 1960 Cyprus, Nicosia, British Council Office - Nicosia
 1960 Pakistan, Lahore, Alhamra Art Gallery
 1957 Spain, Gijon, Salon De Exposiciones Del Real Instituto Jovellanos
 1957 Spain, Oviedo, Galeria De Exposiciones De La Obra Social Y Sultural
 1957 Spain, Madrid, Ateneo De Madrid
 1957 Spain, Salon De Exposiciones De La Sociedad De Amigos Del Arte
 1957 Portugal, Lisbon, Palacio Foz
 1957 Portugal, Porto, Escola Superior De Belas Artes Do Porto
 1954 Ceylon, Colombo, Ceylon Art Gallery
 1954 Switzerland, Fribourg, Musee d'art et d'histoire
 1952 Germany, Berlin, Kunst Templehof
 1950 Canada, Québec, Montreal Museum Of Fine Arts
 1949 Austria, Alpbach, Summer School
 1943 London, Ognisko Polskie (Polish Hearth) Belgrave Square
 1943 London, Belgian Institute, Belgrave Square
 1943 London, Czechoslovak Institute, Grosvenor Place
 1943 London, Greek House, Grovesnor Square

Collections 
Museum of New Zealand Te Papa Tongarewa, Wellington
 Government Art Collection, London 
Birmingham Museum and Art Gallery
 British Council, London

Publications 
 Flowers and their Histories (1956; 2nd ed., 1968)
 Garden Shrubs and their Histories (1963)
 The Quest for Plants: a History of the Horticultural Explorers (1969)
The Plant Hunters (1970)
The Books of Flowers (1973)
The Treasury of Flowers (1975)
Lord Bute (1975)

References 

1905 births
1978 deaths
20th-century English painters
20th-century English women artists
Alumni of the Birmingham School of Art
Alumni of the Slade School of Fine Art
Artists from Birmingham, West Midlands
English watercolourists
English women painters
Women engravers
Women watercolorists
20th-century engravers